A safety harness is a form of protective equipment designed to safeguard the user from injury or death from falling. The core item of a fall arrest system, the harness is usually fabricated from rope, braided wire cable, or synthetic webbing. It is attached securely to a stationary object directly by a locking device or indirectly via a rope, cable, or webbing and one or more locking devices.  Some safety harnesses are used in combination with a shock-absorbing lanyard, which is used to regulate deceleration and thereby prevent a serious G-force injury when the end of the rope is reached.  

An unrelated use with a materially different arresting mechanism is bungee jumping. Though they share certain similar attributes, a safety harness is not to be confused with a climbing harness used for mountaineering, rock climbing, and climbing gyms. Specialized harnesses for animal rescue or transfer, as from a dock to a vessel, are also made.

Standards
In North America, safety harnesses designed for protection against falls from heights in industrial and construction activities are covered by performance standards issued by the American National Standards Institute (ANSI) in the United States and by CSA Group (formerly known as the Canadian Standards Association) in Canada. Specifically, the standards issued are ANSI Z359.1, and CSA Z259.10. These standards are updated approximately every four to five years.

Classifications
There are four classes of fall protection systems:

 Class 1 
Body belts (single or double D-ring), designed to restrain a person in a hazardous work position, prevent a fall, or arrest it completely within  (OSHA). 

 Class 2 
Chest harnesses, used only with limited fall hazards (including no vertical free fall), or for retrieving persons, as from a tank or bin.

 Class 3 
Full body harnesses, designed to arrest the most severe free falls.

 Class 4 
Suspension belts, independent supports used to suspend a worker, such as boatswain's chairs or raising or lowering harnesses.

Other types
Other forms of safety harnesses include:
 Seat belts.
 Child safety seats.
 Over-the-shoulder restraints used on thrill rides at amusement parks.
 A seat with a full-body harness such as used by fighter pilots and racing car drivers.
 Diving harnesses as used in surface supplied diving by professional divers.

Uses

Occupations that may involve the use of safety harnesses include:
 Window cleaner
 Theatrical fly crew member
 Construction worker
 Crane operator
 Bridge painter
 Lineman
 Rock climber
 Motorsport
 Scaffolder
 Sailing
 High ropes
 Bungee jumping
 Professional diver

See also

 Climbing harness

References

List of ppe suppliers, recommended sources. Retrieved 2023-02-23.

External links

Personal protective equipment